The Spoornet Class 10E1, Series 2 of 1990 is a South African electric locomotive.

Between 1990 and 1992, Spoornet placed fiftyClass 10E1, Series 2 electric locomotives with a Co-Co wheel arrangement in mainline service.

Manufacturer
The 3 kV DC Class 10E1, Series 2 electric locomotive was designed for the South African Railways (SAR) by the General Electric Company (GEC) and built by Union Carriage & Wagon (UCW) in Nigel, Transvaal. GEC supplied the electrical equipment while UCW was responsible for the mechanical components and assembly. 

UCW delivered fifty locomotives to Spoornet between 1990 and 1992, numbered in the range from 10-126 to 10-175. Contrary to prior UCW practice, GEC works numbers were allocated to the Class 10E1 locomotives. With the exception of the Class 9E, also a UCW-built GEC locomotive, UCW did not allocate builder’s numbers to previous locomotives it built for the SAR or Spoornet, but used the SAR or Spoornet unit numbers for their record keeping.

Characteristics
The Class 10E1 was introduced as a new standard 3 kV DC heavy goods locomotive.

Brakes
The entire Class 10E1 fleet features electronic chopper control, which is smoother in comparison to the rheostatic resistance control which was used in the Classes 1E to 6E1 electric locomotives.

The locomotive makes use of either regenerative or rheostatic braking, as the situation demands. Both traction and electric braking power are continuously variable, with the electric braking optimised to such an extent that maximum use will be made of the regenerative braking capacity of the  network, with the ability to automatically change over to rheostatic braking whenever the overhead supply system becomes non-receptive.

Bogies
The Class 10E1 was built with sophisticated traction linkages on the bogies. Together with the locomotive's electronic wheel-slip detection system, these traction struts, mounted between the linkages on the bogies and the locomotive body and colloquially referred to as grasshopper legs, ensure the maximum transfer of power to the rails without causing wheel-slip by reducing the adhesion of the leading bogie and increasing that of the trailing bogie by as much as 15% upon starting.

Orientation
This dual cab locomotive has a roof access ladder on one side only, immediately to the right of the cab access door. The roof access ladder end is marked as the no. 2 end. In visual appearance, the Series 1 and Series 2 locomotives are virtually indistinguishable from each other.

Service
Most of the Class 10E1 locomotives were placed in service at Nelspruit and Ermelo in Mpumalanga. In 1998 a number of Spoornet’s electric locomotives and most of their Class 38-000 electro-diesel locomotives were sold to Maquarie-GETX (General Electric Financing) and leased back to Spoornet for a ten-year period which was to expire in 2008. Of the Class 10E, Series 2, numbers 10-136 to 10-173 were included in this leasing deal.

Liveries
The Class 10E2, Series 2 introduced the new Spoornet orange livery with a yellow and blue chevron pattern on the cowcatchers. In the late 1990s at least one was repainted in the Spoornet blue livery with outline numbers on the long hood sides. After 2008 in the Transnet Freight Rail (TFR) era, several received the TFR red, green and yellow livery.

Illustration

References

Cape gauge railway locomotives
Co-Co locomotives
3100
GEC locomotives
Railway locomotives introduced in 1990
Union Carriage & Wagon locomotives